The King's Grave (Kungagraven i Kivik, Kiviksgraven) is an archaeological site. It is situated near Kivik  in the southeastern portion of Scania, Sweden.  The site is what remains of an unusually grand Nordic Bronze Age double burial dating from circa the 15th century BC.

Site
These two burials are unique. Most importantly, the cists are adorned with petroglyphs. The images carved into the stones depict people, animals (including birds and fish), ships, lurs being played, symbols and a chariot drawn by two horses and having four-spoked wheels.

History

The site was used as a quarry for construction materials until 1748, when two farmers discovered a  tomb, with a north-south orientation, constructed with ten slabs of stone. Still, the quarrying continued and some of the stones disappeared. In 1756 the site  was analyzed by  antiquarian and archaeologist Nils Wessman (1712-of–1763). Wessman had undertaken extensive trips to Scania in the 1740s and 1750s for archaeological investigations.

The site was excavated by archaeologist Gustaf Hallström (1880–1962) starting in 1931. From 1925 until his retirement in 1945, Hallström worked as an antiquarian at the Swedish National Heritage Board  (Riksantikvarieämbetet). 
Between 1931–1933, a thorough excavation was undertaken and the remains of a Stone Age settlement was found under the massive cairn, including a great deal of flintstone shards. Only teeth, fragments of bronze, and some pieces of bone were found, dating from the Bronze Age.

The mound contained two cists. It was named the King's Grave due to its size, long before it was known to contain two burials. Since the site has been subject to numerous lootings, there are no reliable finds, but it is believed that the two graves were built at the same time.

After the excavation, the tomb was restored, but no one knows whether it looks similar to its original state. The restoration was based on etchings from the 18th century and conjecture. A new chamber was constructed out of concrete and a tunnel extended into the cists. Today, it is possible for visitors to the site to enter the tomb and to see the engraved stones.

Gallery

See also
 Egtved Girl
 Sagaholm
 Trundholm sun chariot
 Håga Kurgan
 Skelhøj

References

Other sources
 Baudou, Evert Gustaf Hallström: arkeolog i världskrigens epok  (Stockholm: Natur & Kultur. 1997)

External links

 Kiviksgraven english website

Scania
Archaeological sites in Sweden
Nordic Bronze Age
Germanic archaeological sites
Buildings and structures in Skåne County
Tourist attractions in Skåne County
Chariot burials